Kuzminskaya Vystavka is a rural locality (a village) in Parfyonovskoye Rural Settlement, Velikoustyugsky District, Vologda Oblast, Russia. The population was 4 as of 2002.

Geography 
Kuzminskaya Vystavka is located 23 km south of Veliky Ustyug (the district's administrative centre) by road. Parfenovskaya Vystavka is the nearest rural locality.

References 

Rural localities in Velikoustyugsky District